The fourth Fleet is an unofficial term for the flow of convict ships from England to Australia in 1792. The term was coined by C.J. Smee, a historian, who has catalogued the genealogies of the First, Second and Third Fleet convicts and who used the term to group those ships that followed in the months immediately after the Third Fleet. 

The ships connected to the "fleet" are:

Pitt (arrived 14 February)
Kitty (arrived 6 April)
Royal Admiral (arrived 7 October)

Gallery

References

External links
 Convict Transportation Registers Database (Online) University of Queensland. Accessed 9 February 2015.

Convictism in Australia
History of New South Wales
History of immigration to Australia
Maritime history of Australia